Mancera may refer to:

People
Miguel Mancera (b. 1932), Mexican economist
Miguel Ángel Mancera (b. 1966), Mexican politician
Marquis of Mancera
Pedro de Toledo y Leiva, 1st Marquis of Mancera (1585–1654)
Antonio Sebastián de Toledo, 2nd Marquis of Mancera (1608–1715)
Pedro Sarmiento, 3rd Marquis of Mancera (1625–1715)

Places
Mancera de Arriba, Ávila, Spain
Mancera de Abajo, Salamanca, Spain
Mancera Island, Chile